Luke Briscoe (born 11 March 1994) is an English rugby league footballer who plays as a er or  for the Featherstone Rovers in the RFL Championship.

He started his career at the Leeds club, playing on loan at Wakefield Trinity in the Super League, Hunslet in Championship 1 and the Kingstone Press Championship, and Featherstone in the Kingstone Press Championship. He played for Featherstone Rovers in the Championship and joined Leeds on loan in the top flight. He then spent time away from Leeds on dual registration with Featherstone Rovers in the Betfred Championship.

Background
Briscoe was born in Featherstone, West Yorkshire, England. He is the brother of England national rugby league team winger Tom Briscoe who also plays for the Leeds Rhinos.

Career

Leeds
He is signed for the 2012 season onwards, he signed a professional contract 22 September 2011.

He joined Leeds on 22 September 2012, after playing his youth career at Hull F.C. 

He signed a four-year contract with the club. He made three appearances for Leeds and scored once on his début. He was released at the end of the 2015 season.

Wakefield Trinity
Briscoe spent the 2014 Super League season at Wakefield Trinity on a one-year loan deal. However, he only made two appearances and returned to Leeds.

Hunslet RLFC
Briscoe was sent on loan to Hunslet for the rest of the season and played 18 games, scoring 6 tries.

Leeds Rhinos
On 19 Jun 2018 it was reported that he had signed for Leeds in the Super League

Featherstone Rovers (re-join)
On 27 October 2021 it was reported that he had signed for Featherstone Rovers in the RFL Championship in a permanent move
On 28 May 2022, Briscoe played for Featherstone in their 2022 RFL 1895 Cup final loss against Leigh.

References

External links 

Leeds Rhinos profile
Featherstone Rovers profile
SL profile

1994 births
Living people
English rugby league players
Featherstone Rovers players
Hunslet R.L.F.C. players
Leeds Rhinos players
Rugby league fullbacks
Rugby league players from Featherstone
Rugby league wingers
Wakefield Trinity players